Blogs, Wikipedia, Second Life and Beyond: From Production to Produsage is a 2008 book about the new media by Axel Bruns.

The book has been credited with coining and popularizing the term produsage.

Synopsis

Reviews

See also 
prosumer

References 

2008 non-fiction books
English-language books
Books about the media
Sociology books
New media
Internet culture